The discography of the Japanese singer/songwriter Hideaki Tokunaga consists of eighteen studio albums, sixteen compilation albums, and fifty five singles released since 1986.

Albums

Studio albums

Cover albums

Live albums

Compilations

Box sets

Singles

Footnotes

References

External links 
 

Discographies of Japanese artists
Pop music discographies